1997–98 Ukrainian First League was the seventh season of the Ukrainian First League which was won by SC Mykolaiv. The season started on July 30, 1997, and finished on July 9, 1998.

Promotion and relegation

Promoted teams
Two clubs promoted from the 1996-97 Ukrainian Second League.
Group A
 FC Desna Chernihiv – champion (returning after three seasons)
Group B
 FC Avanhard-Industriya Rovenky – champion (debut)

Relegated teams 
Two clubs were relegated from the 1996-97 Ukrainian Top League:
 FC Kremin Kremenchuk – 15th place (debut)
 FC Nyva Vinnytsia – 16th place (returning after four seasons)

Renamed teams
 FC Khimik Zhytomyr changed its name back to FC Polissya Zhytomyr.

Teams
In 1997-98 season, the Ukrainian First League consists of the following teams:

Final standings

Promotion/relegation play-off
To the play-off qualified four teams, the 18th placed team of 1997-98 Ukrainian First League and three group winners of 1997-98 Ukrainian Second League:
 FC Bukovyna Chernivtsi
 FC Podillya Khmelnytskyi (Group A)
 FC Krystal Kherson (Group B)
 FC Shakhtar-2 Donetsk (Group C)

Top three teams qualified for the First League, the fourth and last team qualified for the Second Team. Format was a single round robin in Kyiv and Boryspil, Kyiv Oblast. When tied on points, the main tie-breaker was head-to-head games. The tournament was conducted at almost empty stadiums. The tournament was discontinued right after the second round when it became apparent that Krystal was not able to secure the third and the safe place to receive promotion. The Georgian footballer George Magriani (Podillya) became the top scorer of the tournament with three goals.

Games

Top scorers
Statistics are taken from here.

See also
 Ukrainian Premier League 1997-98
 1997–98 Ukrainian Second League

References

External links
 1997–98 Ukrainian First League. Ukrainian Football from Dmitriy Troschiy.

Ukrainian First League seasons
2
Ukra